The 1996 Major League Soccer All-Star Game was the first Major League Soccer All-Star Game, a soccer match involving all-stars from Major League Soccer. Teams of the best players from each conference played against each other at Giants Stadium, East Rutherford, on July 14, 1996. The MLS All-Stars East won the game 3–2, with goals from Tab Ramos, Giovanni Savarese and Steve Pittman while Preki and Jason Kreis scored for the MLS All-Stars West. MLS All-Stars East midfielder Carlos Valderrama was named as the game's Most Valuable Player. Kevin Stott refereed the game, which was attended by 78,416 spectators.

Venue

Match details

External links
All-Star Game flashback, 1996 at MLSsoccer.com

1996
Soccer in New Jersey
All-Star Game
1996 in sports in New Jersey
Sports competitions in East Rutherford, New Jersey
20th century in East Rutherford, New Jersey
July 1996 sports events in the United States